United Nations Security Council Resolution 431, adopted on July 27, 1978, after recalling resolution 385 (1976), the Council took note of a proposal of a solution to the situation in Namibia and asked the Secretary-General to appoint a Special Representative for Namibia to ensure the independence of Namibia from South Africa as soon as possible. It also called on all concerned to exert their best efforts to resolve the issue, so that free and fair elections could be held.

Resolution 431 was adopted by 13 votes to none; Czechoslovakia and the Soviet Union abstained from voting.

See also
 List of United Nations Security Council Resolutions 401 to 500 (1976–1982)
 Namibian War of Independence
 United Nations Commissioner for Namibia
 South West Africa

References
Text of the Resolution at undocs.org

External links
 

 0431
 0431
 0431
July 1978 events